Rajapalayam block is a revenue block in the Virudhunagar district of Tamil Nadu, India. It has a total of 36 panchayat villages.

References 
 

Virudhunagar district